The 2012–13 SM-liiga season was the 38th season of the SM-liiga, the top level of ice hockey in Finland, since the league's formation in 1975. The title was won by Ässät Pori who defeated Tappara Tampere in the finals.

Teams

 Head coaches marked with ‡ took their jobs mid-season.

Regular season
Each team played four times against every other team (twice home and twice away), getting to 52 games. Additionally, the teams were divided to two groups, where teams would play one extra game. One group included Ässät, Blues, HIFK, Jokerit, Kärpät, Lukko and TPS, while other had HPK, Ilves, JYP, KalPa, Pelicans, SaiPa and Tappara.

Additionally, there were two games where teams could choose the opponents. These were played back-to-back in January and the choices were made in December, with team with lowest point total to that date was able to choose first. These pairs were: Pelicans-Ilves, TPS-Lukko, Ässät-Blues, HIFK-HPK, Tappara-Jokerit, Kärpät-KalPa and SaiPa-JYP.

Top six advanced straight to quarter-finals, while teams between 7th and 10th positions played wild card round for the final two spots. The last-placed team Ilves had to play best-of-seven series against Mestis winner Jukurit.

Playoffs

Wild card round (best-of-three) 
Kärpät-Lukko 1-2
Kärpät-Lukko 4-5
Lukko-Kärpät 2-4
Kärpät-Lukko 2-3 (OT)

HIFK-SaiPa 2-1
HIFK-SaiPa 2-3 (OT)
SaiPa-HIFK 2-3 (OT)
HIFK-SaiPa 5-2

Quarterfinals (best-of-seven) 
Jokerit-Lukko 2-4
Jokerit-Lukko 3-0
Lukko-Jokerit 5-2
Jokerit-Lukko 3-4 (OT)
Lukko-Jokerit 2-1
Jokerit-Lukko 5-2
Lukko-Jokerit 3-1

Tappara-HIFK 4-1
Tappara-HIFK 3-1
HIFK-Tappara 1-4
Tappara-HIFK 3-2
HIFK-Tappara 3-2
Tappara-HIFK 3-1

JYP-HPK 4-1
JYP-HPK 3-1
HPK-JYP 3-2
JYP-HPK 4-2
HPK-JYP 2-3 (OT)
JYP-HPK 5-1

Ässät-KalPa 4-1
Ässät-KalPa 2-1
KalPa-Ässät 0-2
Ässät-KalPa 5-2
KalPa-Ässät 5-0
Ässät-KalPa 3-0

Semifinals (best-of-seven) 
Tappara-Lukko 4-0
Tappara-Lukko 3-2 (OT)
Lukko-Tappara 3-4 (OT)
Tappara-Lukko 3-0
Lukko-Tappara 0-5

JYP-Ässät 1-4
JYP-Ässät 3-4 (OT)
Ässät-JYP 2-0
JYP-Ässät 1-4
Ässät-JYP 1-2
JYP-Ässät 0-1

Bronze-medal game 
JYP-Lukko 2-0

Finals (best-of-seven) 
Tappara-Ässät 2-4
Tappara-Ässät 2-1
Ässät-Tappara 5-1
Tappara-Ässät 3-2
Ässät-Tappara 4-0
Tappara-Ässät 1-2 (OT)
Ässät-Tappara 3-2

Relegation (best-of-seven)
Ilves-Jukurit 4-1
Ilves-Jukurit 2-0
Jukurit-Ilves 1-3
Ilves-Jukurit 2-1 (OT)
Jukurit-Ilves 7-4
Ilves-Jukurit 4-2

External links
Official site of the SM-liiga

1
Finnish
Liiga seasons